Archery at the 2016 South Asian Games were held in Guwahati, India from 5 – 9 February 2016.

Medalists

Recurve

Compound

Medal table

References

External links
Official website

2016 South Asian Games
Events at the 2016 South Asian Games
2016
South Asian Games
2016 South Asian Games